The first Missouri, a 10‑gun side‑wheel frigate, one of the first steam warships in the United States Navy.

History
The USS Missouri was begun at New York Navy Yard in 1840 by shipbuilder Samuel Hartt. She was launched 7 January 1841 and commissioned very early in 1842 with Captain John T. Newton in command. Her engines were capable of 600 horse power, and she was said to have cost $600,000 to build. Departing New York at the end of March 1842 on a trial run to Washington, D.C., with sister ship , Missouri grounded opposite Port Tobacco, Maryland, 1 April, and did not arrive in Washington until 13 April. The warship made numerous trial runs out of the nation's capital during the spring and summer of 1842, demonstrating the advantages of steam propulsion in restricted waters to the Government, and then departed for a long cruise to the Gulf of Mexico. The frigate returned to Washington 25 April 1843 and then underwent an overhaul in preparation for extended distant service.

On 6 August 1843, Missouri embarked Caleb Cushing, the U.S. Minister to China, bound for Alexandria, Egypt, on the first leg of his journey to negotiate the first commercial treaty with China. The same day the ship was visited by President John Tyler who came on board for a few hours cruise in Hampton Roads, observing the crew working the ship in operation. The President disembarked at Old Point Comfort, and the frigate steamed from Norfolk, Virginia, via Fayal in the Azores, for Gibraltar on the first powered crossing of the Atlantic by an American steam warship.

Missouri arrived at Gibraltar on 25 August and anchored in the harbor. On the night of 26 August, the engineer's yeoman accidentally broke and ignited a demijohn of turpentine in the storeroom. The flames spread so rapidly that the Missouris crew had to abandon ship. Minister Cushing was able to rescue his official letter to the Daoguang Emperor of China, allowing him later to carry out his mission. In four hours, the steam frigate was reduced to a blackened and sinking hulk and finally at 03:20 in the morning of  27 August, the forward powder magazine exploded, destroying the burning ship.

British ship of the line  assisted Missouri in fighting the fire and took aboard some 200 of her crew. Sir Robert Wilson, the Governor of Gibraltar, opened the gates of the base to the Missouri survivors in an act of courtesy which was recognised by a resolution of appreciation from Congress. The remnants of the wreck were a hazard to navigation, which were later removed by divers from the shallow waters of the harbor.

The ship's captain, John Newton, was subsequently court-martialed for negligence in the loss of the ship, with the trial concluding in October 1844. Newton was convicted and sentenced to a suspension from service, but on 3 March 1845, President Tyler remitted the remaining portion of the suspension, writing in his order effecting this remittance that "there is nothing implicating in the slightest degree the moral standing of Captain Newton".

See also

List of steam frigates of the United States Navy
Bibliography of early American naval history

References

External links
 

 

Steamships of the United States Navy
Ships built in New York City
1841 ships
History of Gibraltar
Naval magazine explosions
Maritime incidents in April 1842
Maritime incidents in August 1843